The Airco DH.9C was a British passenger aircraft.

Development and design
After World War I there were many surplus Airco DH.9 light bombers, designed by Geoffrey de Havilland, available for the emerging air transport business.  At first stripped DH.9s were used to carry one passenger behind the pilot in the gunner's position, but later versions, designated DH.9B, added a second passenger seat ahead of the pilot.  A second seat behind the pilot was added by extending the rear cockpit in the early DH.9C.  Later DH.9Cs had this rear position converted to hold two passengers face to face, protected by a faired dorsal canopy or cabin.  Most of these later four-seat aircraft had slight sweepback to counter the rearward shift in the centre of gravity.

The DH.9, DH.9B, and DH.9C were dimensionally similar, with the same wingspan and height and only small variations in length depending on the powerplant.  They were two-bay tractor biplanes, with fixed two-wheel main and tail-skid undercarriage.  Their structures were of spruce and ash, wire-braced and fabric-covered.

The first four-seat, swept DH.9C, G-EAYT received its certificate of airworthiness on 13 January 1922.

Operational history
Nineteen aircraft were produced for operators, 13 in the United Kingdom, three in Australia, and three in Spain. The last in service was operated by Northern Air Lines in Barton, Greater Manchester, until 1932.

Operators
Information from 

Qantas (3 aircraft)
Morlae Airways (1 aircraft)

Sneta (precursor to Sabena) (1 aircraft)

Hejaz Air Force (2 aircraft)

KLM (1 aircraft)

Compañía Española de Tráfico Aéreo (CETA) (3 aircraft)

The de Havilland Aeroplane Hire Service (7 aircraft)
Northern Air Lines (2 aircraft)

Specifications

See also

References

Bibliography
Jackson, A.J. De Havilland aircraft since 1909. London: Putnam Publishing Co. Ltd, 1978 

DH.009C
1920s British civil aircraft
Single-engined tractor aircraft
Biplanes
Aircraft first flown in 1921